The men's 200 metres event at the 1973 Summer Universiade was held at the Central Lenin Stadium in Moscow on 18, 19 and 20 August.

Medalists

Results

Heats
Wind:Heat 1: 0.0 m/s, Heat 2: 0.0 m/s, Heat 3: +0.2 m/s, Heat 4: -1.5 m/s, Heat 5: -0.5 m/s, Heat 6: ? m/s

Semifinals
Wind:Heat 1: 0.0 m/s, Heat 2: +0.1 m/s

Final

Wind: +0.1 m/s

References

Athletics at the 1973 Summer Universiade
1973